Blackpole Halt railway station was a station to the north of Worcester, Worcestershire, England.

The station was opened during World War I to serve a nearby munitions factory and closed afterwards, before reopening again between 1940 and 1946 for the same purpose in World War II.

References

Disused railway stations in Worcestershire
Railway stations in Great Britain opened in 1917
Railway stations in Great Britain closed in 1920
Railway stations in Great Britain opened in 1940
Railway stations in Great Britain closed in 1946
Former Great Western Railway stations